Old Norriton Presbyterian Church is a historic Presbyterian church located in East Norriton Township, Montgomery County, Pennsylvania. It was built in 1698, and is a one-story brownstone structure measuring 37 feet, 6 inches, by 27 feet, or three bays by two bays.  It has a wooden shake gable roof and round-arch windows.  The interior features a barrel vault ceiling.

It was added to the National Register of Historic Places in 1979.

References

External links

Lower Providence Presbyterian Church website

Presbyterian churches in Pennsylvania
Churches on the National Register of Historic Places in Pennsylvania
Churches completed in 1698
Churches in Montgomery County, Pennsylvania
17th-century churches in the United States
National Register of Historic Places in Montgomery County, Pennsylvania
1698 establishments in Pennsylvania